This is a list of states in the Holy Roman Empire beginning with the letter Q:

References

Q